Now is the third album by the American band Mucky Pup, released in 1990. The band supported the album with a North American tour.

Track listing
 Hippies Hate Water 3:21
 Three Dead Gophers 3:06
 Jimmies 3:48
 Baby 2:21
 She Quieffed 0:42
 Feeling Sick 1:52
 A Headbanger's Balls & 120 Minutes 1:38
 My Hands, Your Neck 3:18
 Face 2:29
 Hotel Penitentiary 3:04
 Mucky Pumpin' Beat 3:10
 I Know Nobody 2:35
 Walkin With The Devil 1:46
 Yesterdays 2:33
 To Be Lonely 4:21

References 

Mucky Pup albums
1990 albums